The 2014 Nepal Premier League Twenty20 is the first season of the Nepal Premier League. The event is organised by the Cricket Association of Nepal and managed by Zohra Sports Management. It will be organised between May–June 2014 and will comprise 20 overs and 50 overs competitions played in round-robin format followed by semi-finals and finals between the top four teams. The 50 overs tournament ran between 14 and 24 May and the 20 overs tournament will run between 4–14 June. The 50 overs tournament was held in Kailali and Kanchanpur whereas the 20 overs tournament will be held in Kathmandu.

Panchakanya Tej were the winners of the 50 overs tournament after defeating Jagdamba Giants in the final held at Fapla Cricket Ground, Dhangadi, Kailali.

Teams and Standings

Fixtures and Results
The inaugural match of the 50 overs tournament was played on 4 June 2014 at the Tribhuvan University International Cricket Ground, Kathmandu between Vishal Warriors and Colors X-Factors.

League stage

Knockout stage

Semifinal

Final

Statistics

Most runs

Most wickets

Match fees
 Captain रु 5,000 per match 
 Capped players रु 2,500 per match 
 Uncapped players रु 1,000 per match

References

External links 
 Cricketlok
 Republic
 

Nepal Premier League
2014 in Nepalese cricket